Manuel Castro (born 31 December 1923) was a Mexican water polo player. He competed in the men's tournament at the 1952 Summer Olympics.

References

External links
 

1923 births
Possibly living people
Mexican male water polo players
Olympic water polo players of Mexico
Water polo players at the 1952 Summer Olympics